Arthur Apelt (25 August 1907 in Eibau – 1993) was a German conductor and Generalmusikdirektor .

References

External links 
 
 
 Arthur Apelt / Dvorak: Rusalka (Highlights) AllMusic
 Gala Unter Den Linden prestomusic.com

Musicians from Saxony
20th-century German conductors (music)
20th-century German male musicians
1907 births
1993 deaths
People from Görlitz (district)